The 2021–22 Cornell Big Red Men's ice hockey season was the 105th season of play for the program. They represented Cornell University in the 2021–22 NCAA Division I men's ice hockey season and for the 60th season in the ECAC Hockey conference. They were coached by Mike Schafer, in his 26th season, and played their home games at Lynah Rink.

Season
Cornell began its season very well, appearing to have no hangover from its lost year. The Big Red won 9 of its first 10 games and swiftly rose up the rankings, finding itself in the top 10 after the first half of the season. The only problem for Cornell at the time was the strength of its schedule. ECAC Hockey, as a whole, had a dreadful non-conference result and saw many of its teams finding a home at the bottom of the PairWise rankings. Because of that, Cornell had little room for error but, as long as it played consistently for the remainder of the year, the Big Red should be able to earn a tournament bid.

The team returned from its winter break and promptly tripled its loss total for the year. The road series against Arizona State also saw the end of the goaltender rotation between Joe Howe and Nate McDonald as neither had been very reliable over the first dozen games. Mike Schafer turned to freshman Ian Shane as the starter and the young goalie began with a marvelous start, helping the Big Red sweep top-5 North Dakota and look like a sure thing for the tournament.

Prior to the second game against the Fighting Hawks, Schafer tested positive for COVID-19 and was replaced on the bench by associate head coach Ben Syer. The head coach spend several weeks recovering from the virus but, towards the end of the battle, doctors discovered an issue with his circulatory system and found that Schafer needed a coronary stent. The news of their coach's health problem hit the team hard and Cornell went on a 6-game winless streak. The losses dropped the Big Red in the rankings and put them on the tournament bubble. Even after recovering towards the end of the regular season, the strength of schedule problem reared its head and stopped Cornell from being able to climb into the top-15 for the PairWise. Because of that, the team would have to have a strong performance in the conference tournament to have any chance at earning an at-large bid.

Schafer returned to the bench just in time for Cornell's first playoff game and the team responded with an inspired 3–1 win over Colgate. The Big Red continued to play well in the next two games but were stymied by a stellar goaltending performance by Mitch Benson and were knocked out in the quarterfinals. Despite being 8 games over .500, the losses ended Cornell's once promising season.

Departures

Recruiting

Roster
As of August 19, 2021.

Standings

Schedule and results

|-
!colspan=12 style=";" | Exhibition

|-
!colspan=12 style=";" | Regular Season

|-
!colspan=12 style=";" | 

|- align="center" bgcolor="#e0e0e0"
|colspan=12|Cornell Lost Series 1–2

Scoring statistics

Goaltending statistics

Rankings

Note: USCHO did not release a poll in week 24.

Awards and honors

Players drafted into the NHL

2022 NHL Entry Draft

† incoming freshman

References

2021-22
Cornell Big Red
Cornell Big Red
Cornell Big Red
Cornell Big Red